Chen Sicheng (born February 22, 1978 in Shenyang) is a Chinese actor, director and screenwriter. He graduated from the Central Academy of Drama, and is known for his leading roles in the films A Young Prisoner's Revenge and Spring Fever; as well as television series Soldiers Sortie. As a director, Chen is known for the hit television series Beijing Love Story and its film sequel; as well as the blockbuster comedy film series Detective Chinatown.

Personal life
Chen married actress Tong Liya on January 16, 2014. On January 30, 2016, Tong announced that she had given birth to their first child, a son named Chen Duoduo. On May 20, 2021, Tong and Chen announce their divorce.

Filmography

Film

Television series

Awards and nominations

References

External links
 

1978 births
Living people
21st-century Chinese male actors
21st-century Chinese male writers
Central Academy of Drama alumni
Chinese male film actors
Chinese male television actors
Chinese television directors
Film directors from Liaoning
Male actors from Shenyang
Screenwriters from Liaoning
Writers from Shenyang